Nasty Little Beasts is a 2007 children's horror short-story collection by British author Jamie Rix. It was the first book published by Orion in the Grizzly Tales book series, which is continuation/reboot of the book series Grizzly Tales for Gruesome Kids, and is illustrated by Steven Pattison, who illustrated the rest of the books in this new series.

Background and development 

Before Nasty Little Beasts was published, Rix had published four books with Andre Deutsch, Scholastic, Puffin Books, and Hodder, which were used as inspiration to adapt into a children's cartoon series which aired on ITV's CITV timeslot between 2000 and 2006. After the fourth series, there were no more stories to adapt so the rest of the episodes contained newer stories with no source material.

Nasty Little Beasts contains novelised adaptations of four series five and two series six episodes. Possibly due to the cartoon's popularity, the rebooted book series resembles the cartoon with a storyteller framing device—this time, a hotel manager showing the reader the misbehaving children staying in the rooms of The Hot Hell Darkness, all punished there for eternity, and explaining why and how they came to his hotel; each chapter dedicated to their stories. Illustrations show speech bubbles of voices interrupting the stories to comment on unfolding events or make snide comments.

Synopsis

The Grub a Blub Blub 
In Skegness, there is an unusual witchetty grub: a human-sized, anthropomorphic larva that watches television, eats crisps, and cries itself to sleep when stressed. It is nicknamed "The Grub A-Blub-Blub" and hosted at the Museum of Freaks and Oddities, enclosed behind a "DO NOT FEED" sign.

Once upon a time, the larva was Savannah Slumberson, a lazy girl who preferred watching television in her bedroom instead of joining her active parents' rock climbing and cycling holidays. Her parents frequently expected her to participate, and embarrassed her when they sang her awake every morning at 7 am, already in their khaki shorts (either in her room or outside her bedroom window, depending on whether she remembered to lock her bedroom door the night before). She considered herself "cursed", and became lazier out of spite.

For a March holiday, Slumberson had campaigned for a visit to a Bridlington bed and breakfast, but her father announces they would be camping instead. The next morning, the family dressed into their lycra and cycled to the site, except for Slumberson—she hated wearing lycra and faked a cramp, so she slept under a sleeping bag as her parents' bikes dragged her there. She wakes to read a "Fit Camp" sign as her parents rode towards a camping lodge to meet the owner, Mrs Evadne Sprite. Slumberson dreads the holiday to come as Sprite explains camp activities, and tension arises when she learns no one is allowed to spend mornings in bed. A sticky witchetty grub falls from a nearby tree and lands on Slumberson's head, so she crushes it to death with her bike helmet; Sprite adds that the grubs' clinginess are why she encourages her customers to choose many active activities as possible.

Slumberson attempts to sleep for seven days, but her parents insist she wakes up on time so they can sightsee together. They visit museums of unconventional themes, a church, and an aqueduct. As she eats a bowl of grubs, Sprite overhears Slumberson reject another sightseeing trip in favour of holidaying in her own way, so she offers Slumberson's parents a midnight bat walk the next evening. Slumberson had spent the day in her tent sleeping and eating pizza, and does not care she will be alone for awhile, but Sprite advises her to stay in her sleeping bag in case the full moon entices grubs to act unnatural. Six hours later, Slumberson awakes to plopping sounds and the tent roof sinking. She wraps herself in her bag and evacuates the tent, only to be covered and smothered in the web of witchetty grubs.

Her parents return at sunrise, finding a giant witchetty grub that terrifies them. They shoo the grub away, end their holiday and leave for home, and Sprite loans their lot to a family from Skegness. One of the male family members is a museum curator.

Monty's Python 
In Cheshire lives Monty, who chased his sister Mayflower around their farmhouse with any insects he could find. When he had no insects, he pranked her by claiming she had overlooked an insect he placed in her vicinity, and cackled at her paranoid shrieks. One day, he returns home from the pet shop with a python he named , making Mayflower scream so loud, framed pictures fell off the wall and a light bulb broke. Now with a partner in crime, Monty's bullying increased. The mice SisterEater ate helped when Monty almost poisons Mayflower with a "mouse teabag" in her mug and accidentally showed her a terrified mouse running out of the snake's mouth.

It would backfire a week later, when SisterEater's overeating caused a growth spurt and a demand for more food. Monty purposely introduces the python to several of Mayflower's pets, which he eats without hesitation—even Mayflower's pony, which still had her friend Miranda sitting in the pony's saddle. Each unconventional meal continues SisterEater's growth spurts and Monty's options had run out. His mother walks in on Mayflower trapped in a pot and scolds her son, so Monty decides to disown SisterEater any way he can.

SisterEater had grown so much, Monty threaded his body through six bins. Mayflower discovers this and scolds her brother. Monty takes SisterEater to the bathroom to flush him down the toilet, but his size makes for a long struggle. SisterEater blocks the toilet with no sign of improvement and Monty grows paranoid, crossing his legs instead of reuniting with SisterEater when he urinates. Mayflower takes pleasure in her brother's misery, jeering and laughing at him for hours. On day four, Monty gives in and sneaks to the toilet; SisterEater latches his jaw on Monty's head and drags him down the drain. In the sewer, Monty meets children sitting on the sewer ledge wearing collars with hanging metal name-tags—all apathetic to escape. A girl directs Monty's eyes to a wall of various animals and species, but Monty still attempts to escape. SisterEater corners him with a smirk and says he is so hungry he could bite anything. Monty has not tried to escape since, now acting as a pet for SisterEater and the wall of flushed-out-of-boredom animals with his new friends. Mayflower sometimes turns an ear to the toilet to check her brother's cries of anguish can still be heard, and laughs all the way to bed.

The Lobster's Scream 
"I want a more beautiful mummy!" were the first words Shannon Shellfish ever said, seconds after her birth. It set the tone for her life ever since. Shellfish has always been a demanding, ungrateful child and her parents were powerless to stop her. On her first birthday, Shellfish furiously rejected her presents because she wanted to go to Disneyland Paris, so her parents refunded all the presents and obeyed. Despite being too young to enjoy the theme park rides, Shellfish learnt how empowering "I want" felt and became convinced they were magical. Nowadays, dinnertimes at the Shellfish home are constantly eventful where Shellfish demanded food off her parents' plates and screamed when they refused. After a few minutes of screeching, they lost their patience and shuffled parts off their plate to their daughter, but Shellfish then complained what they gave her was too cold to eat. This routine was by design, and Shellfish did not care whether she had more food on her plate or not—the more her parents give in to her demands, the more satisfying the day became.

One day, she demands her parents get her a dog. After picking a breed and leaving the pet shop, she dumps the dog in a skip. To her surprise, her parents immediately ask what she wants to replace it with. Shellfish had never been asked this, and mulls over her answer for the rest of the day, until the doorbell rings. On the doorstep stands a giant lobster, possibly seven feet long if balanced on the tail. Shellfish is in awe, but she immediately discovers it is a highly convincing costume. The wearer is Mr Pecorino, the owner of the Hubble Bubble Boil and Trouble restaurant, promoting his business door-to-door. Shellfish tackles him, demanding he gives her his costume, and threatens to stab him in the eyes with a stick when he tells her "'I want' never gets." Terrified, Pecorino promises to hand it over if she and her family dine at his restaurant.

Mr and Mrs Shellfish warn their daughter that one cannot have a lobster cooked and then not eat it, but Shellfish insists she can do whatever she pleased. Since plans had changed, she needed to be attired suitably for a birthday meal at a sophisticated restaurant. She orders her mother to buy every outfit in a clothes' shop, and then calls them hideous as she dumped the bags outside. She eventually found a dress she wanted, the most expensive in another shop, but would later rip it apart because she wanted it shorter. She demands a limousine escort, then a helicopter after her parents booked the limousine, and a celebrity-like red carpet walk with cheering crowds as the family leave the house. On the day of the birthday meal, she shoos away the crowd and chooses to walk. Upon arriving at Hubble Bubble Boil and Trouble, she orders the largest lobster in the tank. When Pecorino sets the plate down, Shellfish refuses to eat it. Her father reminds her of their lobster conversation and Pecorino is sad if this means the lobster died for nothing. Shellfish ignores the guilt-tripping and chases Pecorino with a wooden spoon, demanding the lobster costume. Pecorino gives in and leaves the cupboard containing it open so she can change. Meanwhile, her meal had come to life and gestured at the lobster tank. The lobsters climb out and rush around the room in formation, making everyone but Shellfish's parents evacuate the building. Shellfish, now in costume, calls out for someone to zip the back just as the tank lobsters pick her up and carry her to a pot full of water mistakenly still boiling on the cooker.

Wolf Child 
Wolves had terrorised the Scottish Highlands for centuries until 1743, when Eagan MacQueen decapitated one and cooked it for dinner. As the head stirred in the pot, its eyes slowly glazed over, as if the wolf was giving Eagan a confirming look of recognition. The wolfpack's revenge was set.

The MacQueen bloodline has continued into the present, and Eagan's descendants live by Darnaway Forest where he fought the pack three centuries ago. Recently, rumours circulated the area that wolfpacks had returned, intensifying when people reported sightings and a stag hunter died. The MacQueen family became just as alert as their neighbours. Elspet and Callum MacQueen have two children, one of them their newborn daughter Moira, and Highland wolves had a reputation of kidnapping babies to feed their families. However, their ten-year-old son Garth became excited at the idea—hopefully, his baby sister being kidnapped would mean his parents would stop ignoring him.

Garth commenced his plan of trying to alert the wolves: throwing tantrums, staining walls with food, crying, thumb-sucking, and babbling. Callum and Elspet are not impressed, not once enthusiastically treating him the same as Moira. When Garth purposely binge ate junk food and vomited in the car, Callum warns his son that the wolves might kidnap him instead of Moira if he continues. After he finishes cleaning Garth and continues driving the family home, a wolf hiding in the bushes watches the car pass its hiding spot. That night, Garth wakes up in a panic after a nightmare about wolves trapping him in his bedroom, and vows to never imitate a baby again.

In the morning, Garth struggles climbing out of bed, discovering his legs are shrinking. When he tries to walk, he fails, reduced to crawling to his door with the handle he could not reach anymore. Garth calls for his parents to help, but they only hear their son resuming his baby imitations and ignore him for the rest of the day. Eventually, they become concerned when Garth's hair and teeth fell out and Elspet suspects it is "wolf-witchery". A howl ringed through the air and they rush outside, remembering Moira was in her pram in their garden to get fresh air. Moira is still there, making them rush back in the house to check on their son. Garth had disappeared, never to be seen again—a successful diversion trap by avenging Highland wolves.

The Fruit Bat 
Cherrie Stone never eats fruit, preferring to eat fast food and food containing saturated sugars. It had made her morbidly obese and frequently constipated. Her concerned parents take her to the doctor, who recommends fruit to help her use the toilet, so Mr and Mrs Stone begin hiding fruit everywhere to tempt her. When it fails, they wear fruit costumes and threaten to collect her from school dressed like this, so Stone attends another school secretly and her parents get arrested for trespassing. Then their hypnotherapy plan of playing audio of fruit to a sleeping Stone failed because the fruits that appeared in her dreams would be destroyed by wasps.

It takes Stone a few days to devise a plan to convince her parents fruit was dangerous. Eventually, she tells them fruit bats smell the fruit in a human's digestive system and eats them alive as they sleep, the remains growing a never-ending stalk. It fails to convince them, but the argument is overheard by a far-away fruit bat, thankful it has found a place to find something to eat. At school, Stone becomes paranoid as she hears unfamiliar noises whenever she discarded the fruit her mother hid all over her school belongings, and runs home when school finishes. At suppertime, her furious mother does not believe her stalking story so Stone goes to bed early; Mrs Stone sneaks a plum into Stone's breast pocket as she sleeps.

At midnight, the fruit bat opens Stone's window, flies onto her bed and eats a hidden tangerine. Then it smells the pocket plum and dives, accidentally stabbing Stone's chest, spraying blood everywhere. Stone wakes up hours later, outside her room, upside down, holding a half-eaten apple and being attacked by schoolchildren throwing stones at her. Examining her surroundings, she realises she had turned into a fruit bat as faeces fell from her and landed on the children. Finally relieved of her constipation, Stone flies away to look for more apples.

The Clothes Pigs 
On Cherry Tree Farm live four tiny, underweight piglets named Insy, Winsy, Nibble and Titch, whose siblings and other family members fight over the trough and successfully eat everything before they can get to it. Bertha the ballerina cow is concerned about the piglets' size, but the piglets were already determined to find food, no matter where it came from.

Somewhere in an adjacent city lives Trueman "Truffle" Shuffle, an extremely lazy boy who dumped his clothes around his home, refuses to walk upstairs without being carried and makes his parents spread toothpaste on his brush. When his parents demand he takes up chores, Truffle insists serving their children's needs are parents' jobs. Eventually, his mother loses her temper and snaps back that "the clothes pigs" will emerge from his messes and chase him with anything they can think of—snout, teeth or trotters—if he refuses to change his attitude. Unconvinced, Truffle points out pigs would never be seen in the streets of their city, especially with all the butcher shops and traffic.

One day, Mrs Shuffle falls down the stairs after tripping over clothing her son had dropped earlier, breaking her leg. Truffle ignores her pained cries for help and orders her to make his dinner, and leaves the house to go the fish and chip shop when she "refuses". When he returns home, his father scolds him for his selfish behaviour, which is at a pitch to carry across the city through the vibrations of garden washing lines. It reaches Cherry Tree Farm and heard by the four starving piglets. They give their goodbyes to their mother and Bertha and leave the farm for the city. On the journey, they sneak into gardens and drag clothes off washing lines by pretending to be clothes pegs. They gather the clothes together and disguise themselves as a man, successfully infiltrating Truffle's city without the public noticing.

When they arrive at Truffle's house, the piglets sneak through the back door cat flap and hide the clothes in a coal hole, quickly jumping into Truffle's dumped ones nearby. Keeping the hood of Truffle's hoodie over his "head" helped fool Truffle's father, who never saw the front of "his son's" head. When the real Truffle returns home, the piglets try to stay out of his way as best as possible, and spy on him eating dinner jealously. Hours later, they wait impatiently under Truffle's mess for Truffle to go to sleep. Truffle enters, dresses into his pyjamas and climbs into bed, and the piglets emerge from the shadows. In the morning, the now-full piglets leave Truffle's hoodie on his empty bed, take their disguise and leave for the farm, returning the stolen clothes along the way. They celebrate their meal by sleeping in the sunshine, excited for their next dinner invitations.

Themes 
Ghostly Tales for Ghastly Kids was the only book in the series with a consistent theme in its collection (ghosts) until the revival. The stories of Nasty Little Beasts contain creatures across the animal kingdom who avenge children. They are either kidnapped or turned into one by the creatures/animals, whereas The Clothes Pigs ends with the main character being eaten by the creatures. Although the titles of the short stories refer to the "beasts" of the stories, the Independent Publishers Group argued the book's title actually refers to the children instead of the insects and animals that punish them.

Cultural references, naming conventions 
The book continues the Grizzly Tales convention of using cultural references and naming conventions to add to the stories' humour. The story titles use play-on-words for pun-based titles, such as "Monty's Python"—a pop-culture reference to the British comedy troupe Monty Python. Another type of title pun is "The Clothes Pigs", which also connects to the Cherry Tree Farm piglets, Truffle's mother's omen, and the piglets' methods to get their dinner. "The Lobster's Scream" is a possible reference to the noise lobsters make when they are boiled.

Publication history 
Nasty Little Beasts was released in paperback, e-book, Kindle e-book and audiobook, read by Rupert Degas. Orion Publishing distributed a two-part edit of Degas' narration as audio download releases with Spoken Network in 2007. It has also been translated in Swedish and Catalan.

Notes

Reception 

To add to the previous praise from the previous book series, Grizzly Tales: Cautionary Tales for Lovers of Squeam! received critical and audience acclaim. Jennifer Taylor for The Bookseller wrote that the reboot books are perfect for children who enjoyed the Horrid Henry books, and The Daily Express wrote that "No house of children should be without one of these."

References

Bibliography

External links 

Grizzly Tales for Gruesome Kids
2007 children's books
Works by Jamie Rix
2007 short story collections
Children's short story collections
Horror short story collections
Fiction about shapeshifting